Saulty is a commune in the Pas-de-Calais department in the Hauts-de-France region of France.

Geography

Population

Places of interest
 The chateau.
 The church of St.Léger, dating from the sixteenth century.
 Traces of an old castle.

See also
Communes of the Pas-de-Calais department

References

Communes of Pas-de-Calais